Portulacaria carrissoana (previously Ceraria carrissoana or Ceraria kuneneana) is a shrubby succulent plant found on the border between Namibia and Angola.

Description
It is a soft-wooded, succulent shrub with flat, round leaves and bisexual flowers.

References

carrissoana
Flora of Angola
Flora of Namibia